This is a list of equestrian statues in Spain.

Madrid 
Equestrian of King Philip III by Giambologna and Pietro Tacca at the Plaza Mayor, 1616, installed in the present place in 1848.
Equestrian of King Felipe IV by Pietro Tacca at the Plaza de Oriente. It was inaugurated in 1843. The bronze equestrian statue was made between 1634 and 1640 by Pietro Tacca, who requested Galileo Galilei's advice to achieve its stability: rear part is solid and front is hollow
Equestrian of Queen Isabella of Castile by Manuel Oms Canet, 1883.
Equestrian of Manuel Gutiérrez de la Concha by Andrés Aleu, 1885.
Equestrian of General Baldomero Espartero, the Peacemaker, by Pablo Gibert, 1886. Probably the best known equestrian sculpture in Spain.
Equestrian of General Martínez Campos by Mariano Benlliure at the Retiro Park, 1907.
Equestrian of King Alfonso XII by Mariano Benlliure at the Retiro Park, 1909.
Equestrian of Don Quixote and Sancho Panza, by Lorenzo Coullaut Valera, part of the Monument to Cervantes at the Plaza de España, 1930.
An aluminium equestrian Los Portadores de la Antorcha (The Torch Bearers) by Anna Hyatt Huntington at the Plaza de Ramón y Cajal (square) in the Ciudad Universitaria, 1955.
Equestrian of José de San Martín in the Parque del Oeste, 1961. The statue is a replica of the one in Buenos Aires by Louis-Joseph Daumas, 1862.
Equestrian of King Carlos III at the Puerta del Sol. Made by Miguel Ángel Rodríguez and Eduardo Zancada in 1994. The statue is a replica of a smaller one sculpted by Juan Pascual de Mena in the 18th century.
 Equestrian of Simón Bolívar in the parque del Oeste. Made by Emilio Laíz Campos. Unveiled in 1970.

Alcázar de San Juan 
Equestrian of Don Quixote and Sancho Panza.

Antequera 
Equestrian of King Fernando I in front of the Palacio de Nájera.

Badajoz 
Equestrian of Hernando de Soto in the Barcarrota.

Barcelona 
Saint George killing the dragon by Pere Johan, relief tondo at Palau de la Generalitat ancient façade (1418)
Saint George by Andreu Aleu, at Palau de la Generalitat façade (1864-1872)
Monument to General Juan Prim by Lluís Puiggener at Parc de la Ciutadella (1887, restored 1945)
Equestrian of Count Ramon Berenguer III by Josep Llimona, at Via Laietana, next to the Roman walls (1888)
Saint James by Manuel Fuxà at Caixa de Barcelona building, Plaça de Sant Jaume (1903)
Tired Saint George, equestrian statue of Saint George by Josep Llimona at Mirador del Llobregat, Montjuïc (1924)
Fountain of Saint George and the Dragon by Frederic Galcerà Alabart at the "Pati dels Tarongers" in the Palace of the Generalitat de Catalunya (1926)
Treball (The Work) and Saviesa (Wisdom) both by Llucià Oslé at Plaça Catalunya (1928)
Barcelona by Frederic Marès at Plaça Catalunya (1928)
Olympic horsemen by Pau Gargallo, at Barcelona Olympic Stadium (1928-1929, restored 1991)
Uranus by Pau Gargallo, at Barcelona City Hall entrance hall (1933, installed 1990)
Saint George on the cloister fountain, by Emili Colom, at the Cathedral (1970)
Longinus riding by Josep Maria Subirachs at Sagrada Família Passion Façade (1996)

Burgos 
Equestrian of El Cid Campeador outside the entrance of the Burgos Cathedral.
Equestrian of Count Diego Rodríguez Porcelos, by Juan de Ávalos at Plaza de Santa Teresa (1983, in the present place since 2011)

Cádiz 
Equestrian of Simón Bolívar.

Cardona 
Equestrian statue of Count Borrell II of Barcelona, by Josep Maria Subirachs (1986)

Córdoba 
Equestrian of General Gonzalo de Córdoba, (Gran Capitán), by Mateo Inurria, 1923. The head is a portrait of El Lagartijo, a famous bullfighter.

Cuenca 
Equestrian of King Alfonso VIII of Castile, by Javier Barrios, 2010. Plaza Obispo Valero, next to the Cathedral

Jerez de la Frontera 
Equestrian of Miguel Primo de Rivera at the Plaza del Arenal.

Logroño 
Equestrian of Baldomero Espartero at the Paseo del Príncipe de Vergara Plaza.

Merida 
 Equestrian of Augustus

 Equestrian statue of Marcus Vipsanius Agrippa by Eduardo Zancada, erected in 2007.

Morella 

Equestrian statue of Ramón Cabrera at Castell de Morella

Reus 
Equestrian of General Juan Prim by Lluís Puiggener at the Plaça de Prim, 1891.

Sant Joan de les Abadesses 
 Fountain of Comte Arnau by Josep Camps at the Plaça d'Anselm Clavé (ca. 1920).

Santander 
Equestrian of General Franco at the Plaza del Ayuntamiento (removed in 2008).

Seville 
Equestrian of King Fernando III at the Plaza Nueva.
Equestrian of El Cid at Prado de San Sebastian by Anna Hyatt Huntington
Equestrian of Simón Bolivar Glorieta de Buenos Aires.
Equestrian of María de las Mercedes Borbón y Orleans at Paseo de Colón.
Equestrian of The Scout, a 1992 gift from Seville's sister-city, Kansas City, Missouri.

Trujillo 
Equestrian of Francisco Pizarro by Charles Rumsey at the Plaza Major, 1926.

Valdepeñas 
Equestrian of Don Quixote

Valencia 
Equestrian of James I of Aragon, by Agapit Vallmitjana i Barbany, 1886.
El Cid by Anna Hyatt Huntington, at Plaça d'Espanya
Equestrian of Francisco Franco, before at Plaça de l'Ajuntament, now at Convent de Sant Doménec

Valladolid 
Monument to Cavalry in Battle of Annual in front of the Academia de Caballería.

Vitoria-Gasteiz 
Equestrian of General Miguel Ricardo de Álava, as part of the Battle of Vitoria Monument, at the Plaza de la Virgen Blanca.

References

Spanish culture
Spain
Statues
 
Sculptures in Spain